House of Sadigjan is a residential building built in the 19th century in Shusha, Merdinli neighborhood. The house where Mirza Asad oghlu Sadig, an Azerbaijani musician, tarzan, composer and developer of the Azerbaijani tar, lived. The building is registered in the name of Sadigov Rahim, the grandson of tarzen Sadigjan.

History 
The house of Mirza Asad oghlu Sadig is located in the Merdinli neighborhood of Shusha, at Sadigjan 40, which currently bears his name. The building is an architectural monument of the 19th century.

Sadigjan's house was destroyed after the city of Shusha came under Armenian control. After the liberation of the city, the ruins of the building were discovered.

References 

Monuments and memorials in Shusha